Gordon K. Wilson (November 23, 1915 – June 8, 1997) was a professional football in the National Football League and the third American Football League. He was drafted by the Cleveland Rams in 1941 and played that season with the Rams and the Columbus Bullies of the AFL. In 1942 and 1943, Wilson played with the Chicago Cardinals, before leaving the team to split the 1944 season between the Brooklyn Tigers and Boston Yanks. He returned to Chicago in 1945 for his final season.

Notes
 

1915 births
People from Choctaw County, Oklahoma
Players of American football from Oklahoma
Tennessee Volunteers football players
Brooklyn Tigers players
Boston Yanks players
Cleveland Rams players
Chicago Cardinals players
UTEP Miners football players
1997 deaths